Tuula-Liina Varis (born June 30, 1942, in Loimaa) is a Finnish writer and journalist. Between 2009 and 2014, she served as the first female president of the Union of Finnish Writers. She was awarded a Runeberg Prize in 2000.

References 

1942 births
Living people
Finnish writers
Finnish journalists
Finnish women writers